The Iran men's national beach handball team is the national team of Iran. It takes part in international beach handball competitions.

World Championship results

Asian Championship results

References

External links
Official website
IHF profile

National beach handball teams
Beach handball